Emre Öztürk (born 26 August 1992) is a Turkish footballer who plays as a left back for Çorum. He made his Süper Lig debut on 20 September 2013.

References

External links
 
 
 Emre Öztürk at eurosport.com
 Emre Öztürk at goal.com
 

1992 births
People from Kocasinan
Living people
Turkish footballers
Association football fullbacks
Association football defenders
Kayseri Erciyesspor footballers
Sivasspor footballers
Manisaspor footballers
Elazığspor footballers
İnegölspor footballers
Boluspor footballers
Süper Lig players
TFF First League players
TFF Second League players